Ferdinand James "Ferd" Hess (February 4, 1848 – December 27, 1928) was an American Democratic politician and farmer who served in the Missouri General Assembly in the Missouri House of Representatives.  Born in Trenton, Tennessee, he moved to Missouri in 1875.  He was also president of the Missouri State Board of Agriculture.

References

External links
Ferdinand James "Ferd" Hess, 

1848 births 
1928 deaths
20th-century American politicians
Missouri Democrats